Norse Projects is a clothing brand based in Copenhagen, Denmark. The company designs and develops seasonal collections of men's and womenswear, blending influences from streetwear and classical workwear with high-end fashion. The creative director of the company is Tobia Sloth.

History
Norse Projects was founded by Tobia Sloth, Anton Juul and Mikkel Grønnebæk as a retail streetwear shop and art gallery in 2004. The company launched its own line of menswear in 2009. In 2013, Norse Projects topped a list of the 15 best Scandinavian men's wear brands by Complex. The company introduced its inaugural womenswear collection for Fall/Winter 2015.

Flagship store
Norse Projects has a multibrand store in Pilestræde 3941 in central Copenhagen that sells brands such as Visvim, Nanamica, Orslow and other imported labels. The store also stocks a selection of art books, magazines and fanzines.
Norse Projects has a mixed multibrand and Norse Project store Kronprinsensgade (No. 3) in central Copenhagen.

References

External links
 Official website
 Multibrand website

Clothing companies of Denmark
Clothing brands of Denmark
Clothing brands
Clothing retailers of Denmark
Clothing companies based in Copenhagen
Danish companies established in 2004
Companies based in Copenhagen Municipality